Christian Müller (born 29 August 1938 in Bergheim) is a former professional German footballer.

Müller made 131 appearances and scored 71 goals in the Bundesliga for 1. FC Köln and Karlsruher SC during his playing career.

References

External links 
 

1938 births
Living people
People from Bergheim, North Rhine-Westphalia
Sportspeople from Cologne (region)
German footballers
Association football forwards
Bundesliga players
1. FC Köln players
Karlsruher SC players
FC Viktoria Köln players
German football managers
Footballers from North Rhine-Westphalia